An incentive spirometer is a handheld medical device used to help patients improve the functioning of their lungs. By training patients to take slow and deep breaths, this simplified spirometer facilitates lung expansion and strengthening. Patients inhale through a mouthpiece, which causes a piston inside the device to rise. This visual feedback helps them monitor their inspiratory effort. Incentive spirometers are commonly used after surgery or other illnesses to prevent pulmonary complications.

Overview
Incentive spirometer is indicated for patients who have had any surgery that might jeopardize respiratory function, particularly surgery to the lungs, but also to patients recovering from cardiac or other surgery involving extended time under anesthesia and prolonged in-bed recovery. Under general anesthesia and inactivity, a patient's breathing may slow, causing air sacs in their lungs to not fully inflate. Atelectasis can develop and, if unmanaged, lead to pneumonia and postoperative fever. Pneumonia is a major lung complication associated with increased morbidity and mortality, length of hospital stay, and likelihood of hospital readmissions. In conjunction with breathing exercises and early mobility, incentive spirometry use is therefore beneficial for patients recovering from pneumonia or rib damage to help minimize the chance of fluid build-up in the lungs. Because of its role in pulmonary rehabilitation and inspiratory muscle training, this device may theoretically benefit patients with COVID-19. It may be used as well by wind instrument players who want to improve their air flow.

Indications
Incentive spirometer is indicated for the following reasons:

 Following abdominal or thoracic surgery to reduce risks of pulmonary complications including atelectasis and pneumonia
 Patients with prolonged immobilization and bed rest
 Chronic Obstructive Pulmonary Disease
 COVID-19
 Cystic Fibrosis
 Sickle Cell Anemia
 Mild to moderate asthma
 Traumatic rib fractures with subsequent complications of hemothorax and flail chest

Contraindications
While there are no absolute contraindications for spirometry use, inspiratory muscle training can worsen some existing medical conditions, including the following:

 Recent or current respiratory tract infection
 Hemoptysis of unknown origin
 Pneumothorax
 Emphysema, due to increased barotrauma
 Thoracic, abdominal, or cerebral aneurysms
 Recent thoracic, abdominal, or eye surgery
 Nausea, vomiting, or acute illness
 Confusion or dementia
 Undiagnosed hypertension

Usage

Patient starts in a seated upright position. Patient exhales completely before using device. The patient then places the mouthpiece into their mouth and seals their lips tightly around it. The patient breathes in from the device as slowly and as deeply as possible, then holds that breath in for 2–6 seconds. This provides back pressure that pops open alveoli. It has the same effect as that which occurs during yawning. An indicator piston driven by the patient's breathing provides a gauge of how well the patient's lungs (or lung if singular) are functioning, by indicating sustained inhalation vacuum. While the patient is holding their breath, the indicator piston will slowly return to the bottom of the column. Patient then removes the mouthpiece from their mouth and exhales normally. Coughing can be expected to clear the airway and lungs of mucus. Patients are encouraged to rest if they begin feeling dizzy.

Generally, patients are encouraged to do many repetitions a day while measuring progress by way of advancing the movable gauge along the central column of the device as they improve.

Alternative approach for children

Traditional incentive spirometers can be more challenging for children due to compliance and submaximal effort. Age-appropriate devices including whistles, pinwheels, and bubble wands should be considered. These toys and activities reinforce proper breathing mechanics by stimulating deep inhalation and prolonged exhalation.

Additional images

See also

References

External links

Medical equipment
Respiratory therapy